Alger Island may refer to:
 Alger Island, New York, part of the Fulton Chain of Lakes in the Adirondack Park in Herkimer County
 Alger Island, Russia, an island in Franz Josef Land
 One of the Wessel Islands in the Northern Territory of Australia

See also
 Alger (disambiguation)